USS MSC 257 was ordered as an AM-218 class motor minesweeper but the classification changed 7 February 1955 to MSC-218 class coastal minesweeper before construction. She was transferred to Denmark and performed her service there as Guldborgsund (M 575).

Description

Construction
Laid down on 17 August 1955 by Stephens Brothers, Inc., Stockton, California, she was launched 17 March 1956. She was christened at Stockton, on 2 April 1956 by Mrs. Arthur C. Bullen Jr., formerly of San Bernardino, California, on the tenth anniversary of her marriage to Cmdr. Bullen, senior assistant in the office of the supervisor of shipbuilding, 12th Naval District, San Francisco.

MSC-257 was transferred to Denmark upon completion and was commissioned on 19 November 1956 as Guldborgsund (M 575).

Operational history

Fate
Guldborgsund was decommissioned 1 May 1993.

References

1956 ships
Ships built in Stockton, California
Royal Danish Navy
Military of Denmark
Mine warfare vessels of the Royal Danish Navy